Ennedi is a department of Ennedi Region in Chad.

References 

Departments of Chad